"My One and Only Love" is a 1953 popular song with music written by Guy Wood and lyrics by Robert Mellin.  Notable renditions by Frank Sinatra (1953), and later by John Coltrane and Johnny Hartman (1963), have made the song part of the jazz standard musical repertoire.

Structure
Published in 1953, it is a conventional 32-bar song with four 8-bar sections, including a bridge ("Type A" or "AABA" song structure). Typically performed as a ballad, it has an aria-like melody that is a challenge to many vocalists; in the key of C, the song's melody extends from G below middle C to the second D above middle C.

History
The song originated in 1947 under the title "Music from Beyond the Moon", with music by Guy B. Wood and lyrics by Jack Lawrence. Vocalist Vic Damone recorded this version in the same year and released it as a B-side to "I'll Always Be In Love With You" (Mercury 5072), but it was unsuccessful. In 1952, Robert Mellin wrote a new title and lyrics for the song, and it was republished the next year as “My One and Only Love”.

Jazz standard
When Frank Sinatra recorded it in 1953 with Nelson Riddle, first released as B-side to his hit single "I've Got the World on a String" (Capitol 2505), it became known as a jazz standard. Then popular saxophonist Charlie Ventura saw the song's "jazz potential" and recorded the first instrumental version in the very same year.

As an instrumental jazz standard, it remained predominantly a song for tenor saxophonists. Ben Webster recorded the tune with Art Tatum in autumn 1956. John Coltrane recorded his version with vocalist Johnny Hartman ten years after Ventura in 1963 (John Coltrane and Johnny Hartman). This was followed by Sonny Rollins in 1964. He re-recorded it in 1977, this time on soprano saxophone. Later interpretations came from Chico Freeman, Michael Brecker, and Joshua Redman.

Vocal renditions of "My One and Only Love" were recorded by Ella Fitzgerald (Decca 29746), Johnny Mathis, Doris Day, Mark Murphy, Chet Baker and Kurt Elling. Cassandra Wilson turned the song into an up-tempo swing number.

Cover versions

References

External links
"My One and Only Love" at jazzstandards.com

1952 songs
Songs written by Robert Mellin
Songs written by Guy Wood
Johnny Mathis songs
Nancy Wilson (jazz singer) songs
Andy Williams songs
1950s jazz standards